Sclerocactus papyracanthus is a species of cactus known by the common names paperspine fishhook cactus, grama grass cactus, paper-spined cactus, and toumeya. It is native to North America, where it occurs from Arizona to New Mexico to Texas and into Chihuahua, Northeastern Mexico.

Description
Sclerocactus papyracanthus is small cactus grows up to 8 centimeters tall by 2.5 wide. It is covered in so many spines they obscure the stems beneath. They are white, tan, or gray in color, papery in texture, and sometimes twisted or wavy in shape.

The actual shape of the flower is an oval pedal.  The flower is up to 2.5 centimeters long and have light-colored outer tepals with dark midstripes. The fruit is green and dry at maturity.

Distribution and habitat
This plant grows in pinyon-juniper woodland and Chihuahuan Desert grassland habitat, usually amidst grama grass (Bouteloua spp.), especially blue grama (Bouteloua gracilis). It is often hard to see the cactus because its spines look like the leaves of the grass.

References

papyracanthus
Cacti of Mexico
Cacti of the United States
Flora of the Chihuahuan Desert
Flora of Arizona
Flora of Chihuahua (state)
Flora of New Mexico
Flora of Texas
Taxa named by George Engelmann